The Communist Party of Kazakhstan (QKP; , Qazaqstan Kommunistık Partiasy) was the ruling and sole legal political party in the Kazakh SSR.

Origin 
The Communist Party of Kazakhstan was founded 1936, when Kazakhstan was granted a Union Republic status within the Soviet Union. The Communist Party of Kazakhstan had been a branch of Communist Party of the Soviet Union (CPSU) until the dissolution of the Soviet Union.

April 24, 1990 from Art. 6 of the Constitution of the Kazakh SSR, the provision on the monopoly of the Communist Party of Kazakhstan on power was excluded.

Post-Soviet restructuring 
The 18th Congress of the Communist Party of Kazakhstan, held on September 7, 1991, decided to dissolve the party. The Socialist Party was created on its basis. Nursultan Nazarbayev, chairman of the party, resigned after the failure of the August putsch in Moscow. Dissatisfied members of the old Communist Party recreated the Communist Party of Kazakhstan in October 1991 at the 19th Congress of the party.

First Secretaries

See also 
 Alma-Ata Regional Committee of the Communist Party of Kazakhstan

References

External links
Official website of the Communist Party of Kazakhstan
A military parade in 1980 in honor of the 60th anniversary of the Communist Party of Kazakhstan

1936 establishments in the Soviet Union
1991 disestablishments in Kazakhstan
Kazakhstan
Communist parties in Kazakhstan
Communist parties in the Soviet Union
Formerly ruling communist parties
Kazakh Soviet Socialist Republic
Political parties disestablished in 1991
Political parties established in 1936